Hutto Commercial Historic District is a historic district listed on the National Register of Historic Places in Hutto, Texas.

Photo gallery

See also

National Register of Historic Places listings in Williamson County, Texas

References

External links

Historic districts on the National Register of Historic Places in Texas
Geography of Williamson County, Texas
National Register of Historic Places in Williamson County, Texas